Glyphipterix diaphora is a moth of the  family Glyphipterigidae. It is found on the Azores and Madeira.

The wingspan is 9–10 mm. The forewings are dark bronzy fuscous, almost black along the margins of a number of white streaks. The hindwings are brownish grey.

References

Moths described in 1894
Glyphipterigidae
Moths of Europe